Breuning is a surname. Notable people with the surname include:

 Gerhard von Breuning (1813–1892), Austrian physician
 Olaf Breuning (born 1970), Swiss artist
 Stephan von Breuning (entomologist) (1894–1983), Austrian entomologist
 Stephan von Breuning (librettist) (1774–1827), German civil servant and librettist
 Walter Breuning (1896–2011), American supercentenarian

See also
 Bruning (surname)